Andrzejewo may refer to the following places:
Andrzejewo, Augustów County in Podlaskie Voivodeship (north-east Poland)
Andrzejewo, Sokółka County in Podlaskie Voivodeship (north-east Poland)
Andrzejewo, Podlaskie Voivodeship (north-east Poland)
Andrzejewo, Masovian Voivodeship (east-central Poland)
Andrzejewo, West Pomeranian Voivodeship (north-west Poland)